Inga Maria Borg (25 August 1925 – 24 October 2017) was a Swedish artist and children's book author. She is best known for writing about the fantasy figure Plupp. She was awarded the Elsa Beskow Award for her books about Plupp in 1970.

Inga Borg was the daughter of swimmer Arne Borg.

Bibliography

Plupp books
 1955 – Plupp och renarna
 1956 – Plupp bygger bo
 1957 – Plupp gör en långfärd
 1960 – Plupp och lämlarna
 1964 – Plupp
 1967 – Plupp reser till havet
 1969 – Plupp och fågelberget
 1971 – Plupp åker flotte
 1972 – Plupp reser till Island
 1977 – Plupp kommer till stan
 1982 – Hemma hos Plupp
 1982 – Vinter hos Plupp
 1982 – Plupp och vårfloden
 1982 – Plupp och midnattssolen
 1983 – Plupp och hans vänner
 1983 – Plupp och björnungarna
 1983 – Plupp i storskogen
 1986 – Plupp och havet
 1986 – Plupp och tranorna
 1986 – Plupp och vargen
 1990 – Plupp och Tuva-Kari i Kolmåreskog
 1991 – Plupp och all världens djur
 1996 – Kalas hos Plupp
 1997 – Plupp och renkalven
 1998 – Plupp och älgen
 2005 – Plupp och lodjuret

Other books
 1959 – Renen Parrak
 1961 – Bamse Brunbjörn
 1962 – Älgen Trampe
 1963 – Svanen Vingevit
 1964 – Micke Rödpäls
 1966 – Tjirr
 1966 – Agnetas ovanliga dag
 1968 – Kiiris långa resa under solen
 1968 – Agnetas dag med pappa
 1971 – Tobby och Tuss i Vilda matilda
 1971 – Djuren kring vårt hus
 1973 – Igelkotten Tryne
 1974 – Vargas valpar
 1977 – Dagboksbilder från Island 
 1979 – I naturens riken 
 1981 – Giraffen kan inte sova
 1982 – Lejonmorgon 
 1983 – När elefanterna dansar
 1986 – Dagar med Simba
 1989 – I Lejonland 
 1990 – Tassa berättar
 1991 – Hund i Paris
 1993 – Sommarlammet
 1995 – Katten Matisse och hans hundar

References

Further reading
 

1925 births
2017 deaths
Swedish cartoonists
Swedish women cartoonists
Swedish children's writers
Swedish children's book illustrators
Swedish women children's writers
Swedish illustrators
Swedish women illustrators
Writers from Stockholm
20th-century Swedish women writers
21st-century Swedish women writers